Anne Harriman Sands Rutherfurd Vanderbilt (February 17, 1861 – April 20, 1940) was an American heiress known for her marriages to prominent men and her role in the development of the Sutton Place neighborhood as a fashionable place to live.

Early life

Anne Harriman was born on February 17, 1861. She was one of eight children born to banker Oliver Harriman (1829–1904) and Laura (née Low) Harriman (1834–1901). Her siblings included Oliver Harriman, Jr. (1862–1940), J. Borden Harriman (1864–1914), and Herbert M. Harriman (1873–1933). Her first cousin, E. H. Harriman, was the father of Governor W. Averell Harriman.

Society life
In 1903, along with Anne Morgan and Elisabeth Marbury, Anne helped organize the Colony Club, the first women's social club in New York. They engaged Stanford White, then New York's most famous architect, to design the interiors of the Club.

Anne was also known for her philanthropy and for devoting "herself to those less fortunate".  She financed the construction of the "open-stair" apartment houses, four large buildings that contained almost 400 apartments on what is now  York Avenue in Manhattan. The buildings were created to house tuberculosis patients.  Vanderbilt donated $1,000,000 and the buildings were completed in 1910.

In 1916, she hosted a fundraiser for the war sufferers of Venice.

In 1919, she was made a Knight of the Légion d'Honneur by the French government and in 1932, she received the rank of Officer of the Légion d'Honneur.

Residences

In 1921, she also sold their country home, "Stepping Stones", in Wheatley Hills in Jericho on Long Island for $500,000 to Ormond Gerald Smith.  The estate was around 125 acres and had a home commissioned by her late husband and designed by John R. Hill.

In 1921, Anne then purchased the former home of Effingham B. Sutton, at 1 Sutton Place, for $50,000 in the then-new neighborhood of Sutton Place, also in Manhattan.  Before her move, along with Elizabeth Marbury, Anne Morgan, her sister, Emeline Harriman Olin, second wife of Stephen Henry Olin, the neighborhood was known as a squalid place.  Vanderbilt, Marbury, and Morgan each hired Mott B. Schmidt (1889–1977), an American architect best known for his buildings in the American Georgian Classical style, to build, or in Vanderbilt's case, renovate homes in the neighborhood.  The society pages of The New York Times scoffed at their relocation and referred to the areas as an "Amazon Enclave."

Mott transformed the home into a thirteen-room townhouse with terraced gardens that overlooked the East River.  The cost of the home renovation was approximately $75,000 in 1921.  Vanderbilt had Elsie de Wolfe design the interiors.  The terrace, done by Renee Prahar, featured two center pillars with ornamental monkeys holding globes of light in their hands.  By January 1929, The Times changed their tune and wrote:

Five years ago, when Mrs. William K. Vanderbilt established her residence in Sutton Place overlooking the East River, it was little dreamed that within so short a time such a marked migration from mid-Manhattan to the East River district would occur as is now in full swing. In the unbroken line of new apartments, lining Fifty-seventh Street almost solidly from Second Avenue to Sutton Place, those who doubted the wisdom of Mrs. Vanderbilt's move have found a convincing answer to their conjectures as to the ultimate success of the Sutton Place movement.

Marriages

She married firstly sportsman Samuel Stevens Sands II (1856–1889), the son of Samuel Stevens Sands (1827-1892), the head of S.S. Sands Co. Before his death from a fall during a hunt at Meadow Brook, she had two sons by Sands:

 George Winthrop Sands (1885–1908), who was married to Tayo Newton, daughter of Dr. B. Newton of New York, in 1905.
 Samuel Stevens Sands III (1884–1913), who married Gertrude Sheldon, daughter of Mary Seney Sheldon and George R. Sheldon, in 1910.

Her second marriage was on June 16, 1890 to Lewis Morris Rutherfurd, Jr. (1859–1901), son of the astronomer Lewis Morris Rutherfurd and brother to Winthrop Rutherfurd. Before his death, she had two daughters by Rutherford:

 Barbara Cairncross Rutherfurd (1895–1939), who married Cyril Hatch, son of Charles Henry Hatch, in 1916. They had one child, Rutherfurd L. Hatch (d. 1947), before divorcing in 1920. In 1924, she married Winfield Jesse Nicholls, a fellow follower of Oom the Omnipotent.  After having two children, Guy Winfield Nicholls and Margaret Mary Nicholls, they divorced in 1930.
 Margaret Stuyvesant Rutherfurd (1891–1976), who first married Ogden Livingston Mills (1884–1937), Secretary of the Treasury. They divorced in 1919.  In 1922, she married Sir Paul Henry Dukes (1889–1967). They divorced in 1929 and, later that same year, she married Prince Charles Michel Joachim Napoléon (1892–1973), son of Joachim, 5th Prince Murat.  They also divorced and in 1939, she married Frederick Leybourne Sprague.

On April 29, 1903, she married her third husband, William Kissam Vanderbilt (1849–1920), in London.  Vanderbilt, who had previously been married to Alva Smith and divorced in 1895, was the son of William Henry Vanderbilt and Maria Louisa Kissam.  He was the father of Consuelo Vanderbilt, William Kissam Vanderbilt II, and Harold Stirling Vanderbilt.  They also remained married until his death.  She had no children by Vanderbilt.

Death and burial
Anne died on April 20, 1940.  She was buried inside the Vanderbilt mausoleum at the Moravian Cemetery, designed by Richard Morris Hunt and constructed in 1885–1886, part of the family's private section within the cemetery. Their mausoleum is a replica of a Romanesque church in Arles, France. The landscaped grounds around the Vanderbilt mausoleum were designed by Frederick Law Olmsted. The Vanderbilt section is not open to the public.

References

External links 

1861 births
1940 deaths
People from Manhattan
Rutherfurd family
Philanthropists from New York (state)
American women philanthropists
Commandeurs of the Légion d'honneur
American women in World War I
20th-century American people
Burials at the Vanderbilt Family Cemetery and Mausoleum